Heteropan scintillans is a moth in the Zygaenidae family. It was described by Francis Walker in 1854 from Sri Lanka. One subspecies is recognized, Heteropan scintillans caesius Jordan, 1923.

References

Moths described in 1854